Pippa Wicks (born 1962/1963) is a British businesswoman, and the former executive director of John Lewis & Partners.

Personal life
Wicks studied zoology at the University of Oxford, and later studied at the London Business School.

Career
Wicks has worked for Bain & Company. In 1993, she left Bain to become finance director at Courtaulds Textiles. Wicks later worked for a business education company before moving to consultancy firm AlixPartners. Wicks was later hired by The Co-operative Group as interim chief operating officer. The move was challenged as a potential conflict of interest, as Wick had done some work for The Co-operative Group whilst at AlixPartners. She had been paid £8,000 a day for the work. Wicks denied the conflict-of-interest allegation. When Wicks joined the Co-operative Group, the company's future was uncertain. At The Co-operative Group, Wicks earned over one million pounds a year. In 2017, Wicks was appointed deputy chief executive officer of The Co-operative Group in a restructure following Richard Pennycook's resignation as CEO. Wicks was an advocate of The Co-operative Group setting up a programme to employ victims of modern slavery, giving them a four-week paid work experience placement. In 2019, whilst Wicks was deputy CEO, Co-op Insurance was merged with Markerstudy Group at a cost of £185 million.

In June 2020, Wicks was announced as the new head of John Lewis & Partners, a British department store which is part of the John Lewis Partnership group. The role has been separated from the previous joint role of head of John Lewis and Waitrose. Wicks took up the position in August 2020, and succeeded Paula Nickolds as head of John Lewis & Partners. At the time of her appointment, she was one of five women on the board of the John Lewis Partnership. Wicks left John Lewis & Partners in February 2023.

References

Living people
Year of birth missing (living people)
British businesspeople
British women in business
Bain & Company employees
John Lewis Partnership people
Alumni of the University of Oxford
1960s births
Alumni of London Business School